Patrick MacFarlan (4 April 1781 – 13 November 1849) was a Scottish minister who served as Moderator of the General Assembly of the Church of Scotland in 1834 and as Moderator of the General Assembly of the Free Church of Scotland in 1845.

Early life and education
He was born in Canongate manse on the Royal Mile in Edinburgh on 4 April 1781, the second son of Helen Macdowall and her husband, John MacFarlan (formerly known as John Warden, 1740–1788). Patrick's father, who was minister of the second charge at Canongate Kirk, changed his name on succeeding to the estate of Balancleroch, Campsie. He died when Patrick was only seven years old. One of his forebears, John Warden, merchant, Falkirk, was a zealous persecutor of the Covenanters. Patrick was the youngest of a large family; his brother John, an advocate, was a friend of Thomas Muir. Patrick's grandfather, John, was also a minister in Stirlinghire - at Campsie. Patrick was educated at the High School in Edinburgh, then studied divinity at the University of Edinburgh.

Early ministry
He was licensed as a minister in the Church of Scotland in 1803. His first appointment was to Kippen in the presbytery of Dunblane in Stirlingshire. In 1810 he was translated to Polmont Parish Church near Falkirk. The high position he now occupied in the estimation of the Church, was shown by his appointment in 1824 as successor to Thomas Chalmers in St John's parish in Glasgow. After two years, however, finding it too heavy a burden, he removed to St Enoch's parish in 1825, where he ministered for several years to a large and influential congregation. At this time he was living at Garnet Hill in Glasgow. In 1830 the University of Edinburgh awarded him with an honorary doctorate (DD).

During the ten years' conflict
He was examined before the Committee of the House of Commons on the Patronage Question, 20 and 25 March 1834. At the time of his being elected moderator in 1834 he was minister of the West Kirk in Greenock and in that town he continued his ministerial labours for seventeen years, until his death. In 1835 he was succeeded as moderator by William Aird Thomson. At the 1834 Assembly, the Veto Act was passed, and the conflict was begun, which ended in the Disruption.

At a public meeting in Greenock, in December 1839, having set forth the position in which the Church was placed, he 
concluded as follows : —

"'Oh!' say some well-intentioned people, 'just submit to the deliverance of the civil courts. It is really painful to think of this contention ; you will tear the country and the church in pieces ; just submit.' Now I do not understand this whining. To me it seems sheer nonsense. It is just saying, ' We conjure you to sacrifice your consciences, and all your views of duty, and all your sense of obligation to the authority of Christ, as the great Head of the Church. Do sacrifice these on the altar of expediency, and make a low bow of submission to the Court of Session.' For myself I answer, I will not yield : If you ask why, I reply, Because I cannot. 
"It has pleased God in His providence to fill me, as far as stipend is concerned, a fuller cup than has fallen to many of my brethren ; but this I say, and say it advisedly, so help me God— holding the views I entertain of this subject, and regarding it as impossible, without a sacrifice of conscience, to submit to and acquiesce in that decree to which I have referred, I would rather cast that cup to the ground than I would taste it again, embittered, as it would be if I were to yield, by the consciousness of having deserted what I believe to be my duty to God, and my duty to the Church."

In the Assemblies of 1840 and 1841 Dr M'Farlan took a leading part, especially in the discussion on Lord Aberdeen's Bill, and in the various proceedings connected with the case of the Strathbogie ministers.

At the Disruption
In the Disruption of 1843 he left the established church to join the Free Church of Scotland.

MacFarlan took a leading part in the campaign against Pluralities, and in the pre-Disruption controversy, making notable contributions to its literature. He was first to sign the Deed of Demission, and as such was made the centre of the Disruption painting. M'Farlan's position and the attitude he maintained attracted special attention, on the part both of friends and opponents, for the simple reason, that the west parish of Greenock was, at that time, the 
richest living in the Church of Scotland.

After the Disruption
After the Disruption, M'Farlan continued for more than six years to minister to a numerous congregation. In the Free Church 
at large, he held a prominent place, and exerted very great influence. He was called to the Moderator's chair in the Assembly of 1845, presiding both at its ordinary meeting in May, and its special meeting at Inverness in August. At the adjourned Assembly in Inverness MacFarlan was assisted, for the Gaelic-speaking public, by John MacDonald, Ferintosh. He was succeeded as Moderator of the General Assembly by Robert James Brown.

Death and legacy
His death took place at Greenock, after a short but severe illness, on 13 November 1849, in the sixty-ninth year of his age. It has been noted that he was the fourth in a succession of ministers, continued from father to son, since the time of the Revolution. In the ministry of the Free Church, he was succeeded by his son, John M'Farlan of the Free Middle Church, Greenock, and his grandson, Andrew Melville of Free St Enoch's, Glasgow.

Family

On 8 January 1808 he married Katharen or Catherine Clason (1786–21 December 1815 aged 31), daughter of Robert Clason of Logie Kirk, south of Dunblane. Katharen's brother was Patrick Clason, Moderator in 1848/9. Patrick and Katharen had issue —

Ann, born 11 April 1810, died 25 November 1831
Helen, born 17 June 1811
Catherine, born 21 June 1813 (married Alexander Melville, minister of Falkirk), died at Paris, 25 February 1866
John, serving in Monkton and Middle Free Church Greenock, born 2 May 1815, died 18 December 1891.

Publications

A Benediction of the Church of Scotland (1850)
The Auchterarder Case
The Rights of Dissenters
Six Sermons (Glasgow, 1825; Edinburgh, 1846)
Strictures on the Rev. Greville Swing's Speech (Glasgow, 1827)
Answer to Remarks . . . by the Rev. Greville Ewing, and to Mr M'Gavin's Letter (Glasgow, 1827)
The Sins of Youth. The Subjects of Mournful Recollections in Later Years (Glasgow, 1846)
Thoughts on Popular Election, Patronage, and Calls (Edinburgh, 1833)
Letters to the People of Scotland (Edinburgh, 1835)
Lecture on Candour in the Investigation of Religious Truth (Edinburgh, 1842)
A Letter to the Friends of the Established Church (Edinburgh, 1842)
Supplementary Letter to the Friends of the Established Church (Edinburgh, 1842)
Address at the Opening of the General Assembly of the Free Church (Edinburgh, 1845)
The Past and Present State of Evangelical Religion in Switzerland (Edinburgh, 1845)
The Gospel Ministry Fund essential to the Maintenance and Extension of the Free Church (Greenock, 1848)
A Vindication of the Church of Scotland (London, 1850)
edited Warden's Essay on the Lord's Supper (Leith, 1808) and Thomas Brown's Sermons'' (Glasgow, 1849)

References

Citations

Sources

See also

1781 births
1849 deaths
Clergy from Edinburgh
19th-century Ministers of the Church of Scotland
Alumni of the University of Edinburgh
Moderators of the General Assembly of the Church of Scotland